The Guizhou JL-9, also known as the FTC-2000 Mountain Eagle, is a family of two-seat supersonic advanced jet trainer and light combat aircraft developed by the Guizhou Aviation Industry Import/Export Company (GAIEC) for the People's Liberation Army Air Force (PLAAF) and the People's Liberation Army Naval Air Force (PLANAF).

Development 
The FTC-2000 started as a GAIEC private venture to develop an inexpensive trainer for fourth generation aircraft. The trainer was revealed at the 2001 China International Aviation & Aerospace Exhibition. The aircraft are reported to be produced at a GAIC assembly line in Anshun, Guizhou.

The FTC-2000, as the JL-9, competed with the Hongdu JL-10 to meet the advanced trainer requirements of the PLAAF and PLANAF. The JL-10 is more technologically advanced, but also more expensive, than the JL-9. In 2013, both had entered production.

A carrier-landing trainer variant was revealed by Chinese state media in 2011. Designated the JL-9G, it has strengthened undercarriage, enlarged wing and diverterless supersonic inlets, but has proved to be unsuitable for arrested landings and is limited to land-based operations.

On 5 September 2018, Chinese state-run Xinhua News Agency reported that GAIC had begun mass production of the FTC-2000G variant. On 28 September it was reported that the first mass-produced FTC-2000G performed its maiden flight. In April 2020, China reported that an unnamed South-East Asian country had placed an order for the FTC-2000G, with deliveries expected between 2021 and 2023.

Design 

The FTC-2000 is developed from the JJ-7/FT-7, the two seat trainer version of Chengdu J-7; the Chengdu J-7 is a Chinese variant of Mig-21. The FTC-2000 uses a new wing, a forward fuselage with side air intakes, and a glass cockpit; the engine, empennage, and mechanical controls of the JJ-7/FT-7 are retained.

Operational history 
The PLANAF had a regiment of JL-9s in 2014.

The PLAAF began using the JL-9 for training on 18 October 2015.

Variants
FTC-2000: Original model and export designation.
FTC-2000G: The FTC-2000G is a dual seat light combat aircraft/lead-in fighter trainer. It is one of the cheapest light fighters on the market with the aim to replace old legacy fighters like the J-7/F-7 and Mig-21. It has 7 hardpoints. It also features a diverterless supersonic inlet. It made its first flight in September 2018. Compared to the FTC-2000 trainer variant, the FTC-2000G is heavier, has maximum speed of only Mach 1.2 due to new wing design, and has less endurance than the FTC-2000. The aircraft can carry maximum 3 tons of weaponry.
JL-9: Initial PLA variant.
JL-9G: PLANAF carrier-trainer variant. It is a modified JL-9 for aircraft carrier training. It is designed for ski-jump ramp takeoffs and simulated arrested landings (land-based). and includes a tailhook.

Operators

Current operators

People's Liberation Army Air Force - 30 JL-9
People's Liberation Army Naval Air Force - 28 JL-9, 12 JL-9G

Myanmar Air Force — six delivered (unknown number ordered)

Sudanese Air Force — six

Specifications (FTC-2000)

See also

References 

JL-9
JL-9
Single-engined jet aircraft
Mikoyan-Gurevich MiG-21
Carrier-based aircraft
Low-wing aircraft
Aircraft first flown in 2003